Henry Barnes Goldthwaite (April 10, 1802 – October 19, 1847) was a justice of the Supreme Court of Alabama, having been appointed in 1837 and reelected until his death in 1847.

Born in Boston, Massachusetts, Goldthwaite ran for Congress as a Democrat in 1842, but was defeated by the incumbent, James Dellet. He was the brother of Senator George Goldthwaite.

Goldthwaite died in Mobile, Alabama, of yellow fever, at the age of 45, and was buried at Magnolia Cemetery.

References

1802 births
1847 deaths
Justices of the Supreme Court of Alabama
Deaths from yellow fever
19th-century American judges